Spiral is a 1978 Polish drama film directed by Krzysztof Zanussi which tells the story of a stranger who turns up at a resort hotel in midwinter, behaves rudely towards other guests and disappears the next day. Found half-frozen in the snow he is taken to hospital where his story is gradually revealed. It was entered into the 1978 Cannes Film Festival.

Cast
 Jan Nowicki - Tomasz Piatek
 Maja Komorowska - Teresa
 Zofia Kucówna - Maria
 Aleksander Bardini - Doctor
 Jan Świderski - Henryk
 Piotr Garlicki - Henryk's Son
 Marian Glinka - Physician
 Ewa Ziętek - Cleaning Woman
 Seweryna Broniszówna - Old Woman
 Andrzej Hudziak - Augustyn
 Marta Ławińska - Psychologist
 Cezary Morawski - Czarek
 Andrzej Szenajch - Guest House Manager
 Stefan Szmidt - Rescuer
 Daria Trafankowska - Nurse

References

External links

1978 films
1970s Polish-language films
1978 drama films
Films directed by Krzysztof Zanussi
Films scored by Wojciech Kilar
Polish drama films